Bairisch Kölldorf is a former municipality in the district of Südoststeiermark in the Austrian state of Styria. Since the 2015 Styria municipal structural reform, it is part of the municipality Bad Gleichenberg.

Geography
The municipality lies about 45 km southeast of Graz and 11 km southeast of Feldbach in the east Styrian hills.

References

Cities and towns in Südoststeiermark District